Stephanie Lemelin is an American actress and comedienne. She is best known for voicing Artemis Crock on Young Justice, Eep on Dawn of the Croods and Audrey on Harvey Girls Forever!.

Education
Lemelin graduated in 2001 from the University of Pennsylvania, majoring in communications and minoring in English. During her junior year, she spent a year abroad at the University of New South Wales in Sydney, Australia, while also interning for Network 9 as a production assistant.

Career
In 2007, she joined In-Motion Pictures as a writer and producer of independent films. She co-wrote screenplays for Absolute Fear (formerly known as Project Fear) and Special Ops (formerly titled Disarmed). 

In 2008, Lemelin began voice-over work, playing an animated character in the DreamWorks' Kung Fu Panda franchise, as well as voicing several commercials. She may be best-known for her series regular role on the Cartoon Network's popular cartoon, Young Justice. In November 2016, production began for the third season of the Young Justice series with Lemelin as a key cast member.

Lemelin also has recurring characters in other cartoons such as "Fanboy & Chum Chum" (as Nurse Lady Pam) and the Skechers-produced movie "Twinkletoes" (playing Sporty Shorty).

As of 2011, in addition to acting in several studio and independent films (Playdate, WER, Get the Gringo, Absolute Fear, and The Republic of Two), Lemelin has been cast in 12 consecutive TV pilots (several of which went to series), including Men at Work (TNT), $#*! My Dad Says (CBS), The Whole Truth (ABC), Bunker Hill (TNT), Canned (ABC), Good Behavior (ABC), Cavemen (ABC), The Funkhousers (ABC), as well as FOX's Worst Week of My Life, Dirtbags, and Titletown, and had a lead in the SciFi Channel's original TV movie/back door pilot Anonymous Rex based on the books by Eric Garcia. Lemelin has also guest-starred in many network shows, with comedic and dramatic roles on Bones (FOX), The Mentalist (CBS), Brothers and Sisters (ABC), The League (FX), The Closer (TNT), Melissa & Joey (ABC Family), CSI: Las Vegas (CBS), Malcolm in the Middle (Fox), Rules of Engagement (CBS), Run of the House (WB), Out of Practice (CBS) and The Mullets (UPN). Her network television debut was on the critically acclaimed but short-lived Fox show Undeclared, in which she was cast one month after moving to Los Angeles.

Volunteerism
In 2010, Lemelin joined the board of the nonprofit Angel City Pit Bulls. Since 2002, she has regularly volunteered with Los Angeles-based Free Arts for Abused Children, and she is a regular volunteer for Best Friends Animal Society, including for its Pup My Ride program, which transports small dogs from high-kill animal shelters to other parts of the United States where there is a greater demand for small dogs.

Personal life
Lemelin has lived in both Canada and the United States, where she holds dual citizenship. She and husband, A.J. Draven, a martial artist, have three children. Her father is former NHL goalie Reggie Lemelin.

Filmography

Film

Television

Video games

References

External links

 

1979 births
21st-century American actresses
Living people
Activists from New York (state)
Actresses from Los Angeles
American film actresses
American television actresses
American video game actresses
American voice actresses
University of Pennsylvania alumni